The Falacho River is a small river in the Portuguese region of the Algarve and is a tributary of the Arade River with the river's confluence located west of the town of Silves.

References 

Rivers of Portugal
Rivers of the Algarve